This is the progression of world record improvements of the high jump W80 division of Masters athletics.

Key

References

Masters athletics world record progressions
High